The European Film Award for Best Documentary or Prix Arte has been awarded annually since 1989 by the European Film Academy. Special Mentions were presented alongside the winner of the award until 1993, since 1999 a set of nominees are presented out of which a winner is chosen.

Criteria
Documentary films taken into consideration must have a minimum length of 70 minutes. They must have either had a theatrical release in at least one European country, at a European competitive feature film festival accredited by FIAPF or been screened at one of the following documentary festivals:
 Cinéma du Réel (France)
 Copenhagen International Documentary Festival (Denmark)
 Doclisboa (Portugal)
 Dok Leipzig (Germany)
 International Documentary Film Festival Amsterdam (The Netherlands)
 Jihlava International Documentary Film Festival (Czech Republic)
 Kraków Film Festival (Poland)
 Sheffield Doc/Fest (UK)
 Thessaloniki Documentary Festival (Greece)
 Visions du Réel (Switzerland)

Winners and nominees
The winners are in a yellow background and in bold.

1980s

1990s

 Jury Special Award
 Special Mention

2000s

2010s

2020s

References

External links
European Film Academy archive

Docu
Documentary film awards
Awards established in 1989